Alexandru Cătălin Aldea (born 5 March 1995) is a Romanian professional footballer who plays as a centre midfielder or defensive midfielder.

Career statistics

Club

Honours
 FCSB
Romanian Liga I: 2013–14

References

External links
 

Living people
1995 births
Romanian footballers
Footballers from Bucharest
Association football midfielders
FC Steaua București players
CSM Ceahlăul Piatra Neamț players
FC Steaua II București players
CSA Steaua București footballers
CS Balotești players
Liga I players
Liga II players
Liga III players